The University of Montenegro Faculty of Medicine (Montenegrin: Medicinski fakultet Univerziteta Crne Gore Медицински факултет Универзитета Црне Горе) is one of the educational institutions of the University of Montenegro. The Faculty's main building is located in Podgorica, near the Clinical Center of Montenegro.

History 
The Podgorica Medical School was officially established in 1997. In 2005, as part of the Faculty, the postgraduate High School for Nurses was founded in Berane.

Organization
The Faculty is a teaching-scientific institution which organizes the practical part of teaching in the teaching-scientific bases: Clinical Center of Montenegro, Public Health Institute, Institute Dr Simo Milošević in Igalo, Hospital for Pulmonary Diseases Brezovik and various health centers. Five study groups are currently being provided at the Faculty:
 Undergraduate Academic Studies:
 Medicine
 Dentistry
 Applied Studies (at the High School for Nurses in Berane)
 Doctoral studies
 Specialization of Medical Workers

References

Medicine
Medical schools in Montenegro
Medicine
Medicine
Montenegro
1997 establishments in Montenegro